The Volta a Lleida was a road cycling stage race held in the Lleida region of Spain. It was a 2.2 category race on the UCI Europe Tour between 2005 and 2008.

List of overall winners

References
Official Website

 
UCI Europe Tour races
Recurring sporting events established in 1942
Recurring sporting events disestablished in 2008
Defunct cycling races in Spain
2008 disestablishments in Spain
1942 establishments in Spain